Alfred Common (25 May 1880 in Millfield (Sunderland) – 3 April 1946 in Darlington) was an English footballer who played at inside forward or centre forward. He is most famous for being the first player to be transferred for a fee of £1,000 on his transfer to Middlesbrough from Sunderland in 1905.


Club career
Common played for South Hylton and Jarrow in North East England before joining Sunderland in 1900. Sunderland finished Division One runners-up in 1900–01, after which Common transferred to Sheffield United in October 1901 for £325. Neither Sunderland nor Sheffield United had cause to regret the deal in the sense that Sunderland finished as Division One Champions in 1901–02, and Common scored the first goal in United's 1902 FA Cup Final win over Southampton.

Common became a regular member of Sheffield United teams, and won the first of his three international caps in 1904, but in May of that year he refused to re-sign for United because he wished to return to Sunderland where he was reported to have 'business interests'. United failed to persuade Common to change his mind and in the summer of 1904, he returned to Sunderland. The deal also took United's reserve goalkeeper Albert Lewis in return for a new record fee of around £520.

In February 1905, little more than six months after this move, he broke the transfer record again by moving to Middlesbrough for £1,000. Middlesbrough had purchased Common in an attempt to avoid relegation to the Second Division. His first game for Middlesbrough was on 25 February 1905, away to his former club Sheffield United. Middlesbrough won 1–0, with Common scoring from a penalty after 50 minutes, it was their first away win for nearly two years. Consequently, the team, who had so far been battling against relegation that season, survived the drop. He played 168 league games for Boro and scored 58 goals.

At the age of 30, Common moved to Woolwich Arsenal in 1910. He made his debut on 1 September 1910 against Manchester United. After starting out at inside forward, he took on a more attacking role in his second season and was the club's top goalscorer with 17 goals in 1911–12, missing just two league games. However, he didn't score a single goal in the first half of the Gunners' 1912–13 season, before he was sold to Preston North End in December 1912 for £250. Altogether he played 80 times and scored a sum of 23 goals for Arsenal.

At Preston, he helped the club to win the Division Two title that season, although they were relegated the following 1913–14 season.

Common retired from football in 1914, and went on to run pubs in Darlington until 1943. He died in 1946 aged 65.

In 1998, he was selected as one of the Football League's 100 Football League Legends. His keepsakes, England caps and cup winners medals etc. were auctioned by Graham Budd Auctions in London in November 2011.

International career
Common won his first England cap against Wales on 29 February 1904. In all he won three caps, scoring two goals.

Career statistics

Club

Honours
Sunderland
Football League Division One Runners Up Medal: 1900–01

Sheffield United
FA Cup: 1902

Preston North End
Second Division: 1913

References

External links
 

1880 births
1946 deaths
Footballers from Sunderland
English footballers
Association football forwards
Sunderland A.F.C. players
Sheffield United F.C. players
Middlesbrough F.C. players
Arsenal F.C. players
Preston North End F.C. players
English Football League players
English Football League representative players
England international footballers
FA Cup Final players